Tickfaw was founded in 1852 and is a village in Tangipahoa Parish, Louisiana, United States. The population was 694 at the 2010 census.  Tickfaw is part of the Hammond Micropolitan Statistical Area. It was originally inhabited by Italian-American immigrants and continues to have a distinct Italian-American heritage.

History

Tickfaw is an Indian name which means "Rest Among the Pines." It derives from a contraction of the Choctaw words tiak "pine" and foha "rest" or "ease".

The Village was incorporated in 1957 under the leadership of Joe Greco, who later became the first Mayor.  The governing body consists of the Mayor, the Board of Aldermen and an elected Chief of Police.

Geography

Demographics

2020 census

As of the 2020 United States census, there were 635 people, 257 households, and 187 families residing in the village.

2000 census
As of the census of 2000, there were 617 people, 241 households, and 166 families residing in the village. The racial makeup of the village was 86.71% White, 11.51% African American, 0.65% Native American, and 1.13% from two or more races. Hispanic or Latino of any race were 4.54% of the population.

There were 241 households, out of which 36.1% had children under the age of 18 living with them, 53.1% were married couples living together, 11.6% had a female householder with no husband present, and 31.1% were non-families. 26.6% of all households were made up of individuals, and 10.0% had someone living alone who was 65 years of age or older. The average household size was 2.56 and the average family size was 3.10.

In the village, the population was spread out, with 26.1% under the age of 18, 11.5% from 18 to 24, 28.7% from 25 to 44, 21.6% from 45 to 64, and 12.2% who were 65 years of age or older. The median age was 34 years. For every 100 females, there were 98.4 males. For every 100 females age 18 and over, there were 90.8 males.

The median income for a household in the village was $23,333, and the median income for a family was $32,143. Males had a median income of $31,875 versus $19,688 for females. The per capita income for the village was $13,761. About 27.2% of families and 31.9% of the population were below the poverty line, including 38.0% of those under age 18 and 21.6% of those age 65 or over.

Notable people
Robert Billiot, Democratic member of the Louisiana House of Representatives for Jefferson Parish since 2008; former educator from Westwego and former resident of Tickfaw
Kim Mulkey, head coach, LSU Tigers basketball; Women's Basketball Hall of Fame inductee as both player and coach
Jayden Hauck, 2022 Girls Singles National Champion, Louisville, Kentucky

References

Villages in Louisiana
Villages in Tangipahoa Parish, Louisiana